= Jatoi railway station =

Railway station in Pakistan

Coordinates: 26.773706°N 68.002509°E

General information
- Owner: Ministry of Railways

Other information
- Station code: JTOI

History
- Former names: Great Indian Peninsula Railway
Location

Jatoi railway station (Urdu: جتوئی ریلوے اسٹیشن) is located in Pakistan.

== See also ==
- List of railway stations in Pakistan
- Pakistan Railways
